Brigadier general John Harold Whitworth Becke,  (17 September 1879 – 7 February 1949) was an infantry officer in the Second Boer War and squadron, wing and brigade commander in the Royal Flying Corps during World War I. He transferred to the Royal Air Force (RAF) on its creation on 1 April 1918 as a temporary brigadier general. He retired from the RAF in 1920.

He was born in Liverpool on 17 September 1879. As a captain in the Sherwood Foresters, he was seconded to the Royal Flying Corps and awarded his Royal Aero Club aviators certificate on 18 June 1912 flying a Bristol Biplane at Brooklands. Becke was the first commanding officer of No. 6 Squadron, one of a handful of flying squadrons to be established before the First World War.

References

External links
Air of Authority – A History of RAF Organisation – Brigadier-General J H W Becke
No. II(AC) Squadron – Major J H W Becke

|-

|-

|-

|-

Royal Flying Corps officers
Royal Air Force generals of World War I
Companions of the Order of St Michael and St George
Companions of the Distinguished Service Order
Recipients of the Air Force Cross (United Kingdom)
Officiers of the Légion d'honneur
Recipients of the Croix de Guerre 1914–1918 (France)
Sherwood Foresters officers
1879 births
1949 deaths
Military personnel from Liverpool
British Army personnel of the Second Boer War